The Boomerang was a weekly newspaper published in Brisbane, Queensland, Australia.

History 
The newspaper was established by William Lane in 1887, publishing its first issue on 19 November 1887. James Drake, future Attorney-General of Australia, was a shareholder, writer and joint editor.

In 1891, Lane was approached to be the editor of The Worker, a newspaper being established by the local labour unions. As a consequence, Lane sold The Boomerang to Gresley Lukin. Lukin published the newspaper until 9 April 1892 after the company was voluntarily wound up.

Alfred Stephens worked as a sub-editor, but left in 1891 to become editor and part proprietor of the Cairns Argus. Other staff included Alfred Yewen.

No connection has been found between this newspaper and the 1894 Melbourne Boomerang weekly published by George Prendergast and Edward Findley.

A hand-written index to The Boomerang is held by the John Oxley Library, State Library of Queensland.

References

External links 
The Boomerang. No. 1 (Nov. 19, 1887) - no. 59 (Dec. 29, 1888). State Library of Queensland

Boomerang
1887 establishments in Australia
Publications established in 1887
Defunct newspapers published in Queensland